Koskela is a Finnish surname meaning "a place of rapids". Notable people with the surname include:

Harri Koskela (born 1965), Finnish wrestler
Jari Koskela, Finnish politician
Lauri Koskela (1907–1944), Finnish wrestler 
Niina Koskela (born 1971), Finnish chess grandmaster 
Pekka Koskela (born 1982), Finnish  speedskater
Terho Koskela (born 1964), Swedish ice hockey player
Tero Koskela (born 1976), Finnish  footballer
Toni Koskela (born 1983), Finnish  footballer

Fictional characters
 Olof Koskela, a main character of the novel The Song of the Blood-Red Flower by Johannes Linnankoski
 Multiple characters in the novels by Väinö Linna

Finnish-language surnames

fr:Koskela